The Battle of Hyrba was the first battle between the Persians and Medians, taking place around 552 BC. It was also the first battle after the Persians had revolted. These actions were led (for the most part) by Cyrus the Great, as he shifted the powers of the ancient Middle East. The Persian success in the battle led to the creation of Persia's first empire and began Cyrus's decade long conquest of almost all of the known world. Though the only authority with a detailed account of the battle was Nicolaus of Damascus, other well-known historians such as Herodotus, Ctesias, and Strabo also mention the battle in their own accounts.

The outcome of the battle was such a great blow to the Medes that Astyages decided to personally invade Persia. The hasty invasion eventually led to his downfall. In turn, the former enemies of the Medes tried to move against them, only to be stopped by Cyrus. Thus a period of reconciliation began, which facilitated a close relationship between the Persians and Medes, and enabled Ecbatana, capital of Media, to pass to the Persians as one of Persia's capitals in the newly formed empire.

Background
The battle occurred after the Persian Revolt, which is known to have taken place in the summer of 553 BC. Based on scant sources the battle (which was in Hyrba) is believed to have taken place at least half a year after the revolt had already begun, probably in the beginning of winter in 552 BC. Astyages, the king of Medes, who is thought to have also been Cyrus's grandfather, had earlier turned down the request of Cyrus to leave his court and visit his parents again, as he had done several times earlier. Though his request to Astyages was not unusual, Cyrus had made the mistake of asking him right after the revolt that had happened, but through the pleading of the Persian servant, Oebares, Astyages let him visit his parents again. In Herodotus' version, in one of the first times Cyrus had gone to his parents, the Median general Harpagus had secretly sent a letter stuffed in a hare to Cyrus to plot a revolt, and Cyrus passed the letter on to his father. This matches the account of Nicolaus in which he says that Cambyses I had already assembled many troops well before the battle had started, and that he later despatched a small number to Cyrus's aid. Cyrus sent a message to his father saying "... send at once 1000 cavalry and 5000 foot-soldiers to the city of Hyrba which lay on the way, and to arm the rest of the Persians as quickly as possible in such a way that it should seem to be done by command of the king. His true aims he did not communicate to him." This also confirms the notion that the battle took place months, not days, after the revolt. Astyages' decision to let Cyrus return to his parents is considered by some to have changed history by eventually enabling the Persis province to become the most powerful state in the ancient world.

The motives
Cyrus was in Ecbatana when the revolt had already begun. In Nicolaus's account, when Cyrus was let go, he fled from Astyages because he knew he might eventually be executed if Astyages discovered that Cyrus's true motive  was to join and fight alongside his father, if necessary. This is because when Cyrus was half way to becoming an adult he learned that Astyages had already tried to execute him when he was an infant, but it did not succeed, and as time passed, Astyages came to respect Cyrus for the similarities of character they shared. Meanwhile, Astyages was not sure if it was safe to let Cyrus return to his homeland. Astyages eventually did, and it helped terminate the Median kingdom. When Astyages was tricked by Harpagus twice into believing Cyrus was not a danger to him, even when the revolt and impending signs of danger had already happened, Cyrus saw how easily Astyages could be swindled. For this reason, Cyrus may have taken advantage of this to bring freedom to his own kingdom.

Meanwhile, Astyages invited the best singer of the Medes, and the last song played by the professional minstrel that was also a Magus, named Angares, which was also accompanied by a girl, disturbed Astyages deeply.
A fierce wild beast, 
more fierce than any boar, 
was let go, 
and sent into a sunny country and he should reign over all these provinces and should, 
with a handful of men, 
maintain war against large armies.

Astyages tried to call Cyrus back again, but could not get him.

The battle

Concerning the troops types, it is unknown whether or not the Persian infantry engaged in the battle. It is most likely Cyrus and the cavalry he had escaped with from Media fought directly with the Median cavalry Astyages had sent to bring Cyrus back. Cyrus might have known he needed all his men when fighting Astyages's best cavalry, for when battle had started, Cyrus with his will and superior numbers had the advantage. Nicolas goes as far as to say Cyrus first displayed his bravery in this battle. Nevertheless, Cyrus's tactics proved successful in maintaining the war. In Herodotus' Histories, he hints the first battle between the Persians and Medes, which Harpagus goes over to Cyrus, and most of the Medes either joined Cyrus or were killed, with a small force escaping back to Media. This seems to go in accordance with Nicolaus' account of the first battle.

Aftermath

While Cambyses met with his son and organized the 350,000+ men, Astyages armed men under and over age for fighting battles, and from all over the empire, to come. Purportedly with 1,205,000+ men, Astyages marched his troops out. Most historians consider this number fantastic, but others consider it as part of the reserves. This is because in the battles to come, no more than 200,000 men from either side would actually take to the field. When Astyages knew he had underestimated Cyrus, he knew putting down a revolt was not enough, but a massive invasion had to be carried out, so the invasion of Persia by Astyages began.

Historical assessment
The battle was the first major blow to the Medes, as this was the first time in a long time that Media had been defeated in a battle. As Cyrus's first victory in the war, it did not go well with Astyages, the king of the Medes. It also caused the northern satraps to revolt, and ally their provinces with Persia. Years after the war, the Persians and Medes still held a deep appreciation of one another, and some Medes were allowed to become part of the Persian Immortals. Since the early 1900s this battle was almost forgotten to history. As most of its account comes from fragments, only in the later modern age historians have renewed interest in this (now considered) historic event which changed the ancient world. This is because the battle started a chain reaction of events which led Persia to become the most powerful state for the next quarter of a millennia.

See also

Battle of the Persian Border

Notes

References
The Nabonidus Cylinder from Sippar.
Fischer, W.B., Ilya Gershevitch, and Ehsan Yarshster, The Cambridge History of Iran, Cambridge University Press (1993). In 1 volume. 
Max Duncker, The History of Antiquity, tr. Evelyn Abbott. London, Richard Bentley & Son (1881). 
Chisholm, Hugh, The Encyclopædia Britannica: A Dictionary of Arts, Sciences, Literature and General Information, Cambridge, England; New York: At the University Press, (1910). 
Laymon, Charles M., The Interpreter's One Volume Commentary on the Bible: Introduction and Commentary, Abingdon Press, (1971). 
Herodotus, Godley A. D., Herodotus, London, W. Heinemann; New York, G.P. Putnam's Sons, (1921–24).  (Reprint ed.)
James Ussher, Larry Pierce, Marion Pierce, The Annals of the World, Green Forest, AR : Master Books, (2006). 
Herodotus, The History of Herodotus, tr. G. C. Macaulay, S.l.: Kessinger Publications, (1890)  (2010 reprint ed.)
Clare, Israel Smith. The unrivaled history of the world, containing a full and complete record of the human race from the earliest historical period to the present time, embracing a general survey of the progress of mankind in national and social life, civil government, religion, literature, science and art... Chicago, The Werner Company, (1893).

Bibliography

Classical sources
The Nabonidus Chronicle of the Babylonian Chronicles

Herodotus (The Histories) I, 127-128
Ctesias (Persica)?
Justin, Epitome of the Philippic History of Pompeius Trogus I, 6 
Fragments of Nicolaus of Damascus
Strabo (History) XV, 3.8
Athenaeus (Deipnosophistae), 1.14 (633e) 6:419 (Quotes)

Modern sources
 Rawlinson, George (1885). The Seven Great Monarchies of the Eastern World, New York, John B. Eldan Press, reprint (2007) p. 120-121. In 4 volumes. 
 Fischer, W.B., Ilya Gershevitch, and Ehsan Yarshster, The Cambridge History of Iran, Cambridge University Press (1993)  p. 145. In 1 volume. 
 Stearns, Peter N., and Langer, William L. (2004). The Encyclopedia of World History: Ancient, Medieval, and Modern, Chronologically Arranged, Boston, Houghton Mifflin Press, (2001) p. 40. In 6 editions.

External links
Full text in HTML format of Max Duncker's "History of Antiquity", translated by Evelyn Abbott
  M. A. Dandamaev, A Political History of the Achaemenid Empire, tr. W. J. Vogelsang, (1989) the battle.
 James Orr, The International Standard Bible Encyclopaedia, Chicago, The Howard-Severance Co. (1915) the combatants.
 Hastings' Dictionary of the Bible other details.
Cyrus takes Babylon: the Nabonidus chronicle in Nabonidus's chronicle he says Cyrus fought the last battle in 550 BC, but in another chronicle he says the revolt began in the summer of 553 BC and the first battle took place a little later, which then one would get a deduced date of 552 BC for the possible date of the first battle. Details from Herodotus' and Nicolas' accounts also suggest the actual battle took place half a year after the revolt, which if one counts forward from the summer of 553 BC, one would reach the beginning of 552 BC. This  would have also given Cambyses ample time to gather the army and allies for battle.

552 BC
Hyrba
Hyrba
Iranian civil wars
6th century BC
Hyrba